Bakacak is a village in the Refahiye District of Erzincan Province in Turkey.

References

Villages in Refahiye District